"C'est pour toi" (meaning "It's for You") is the first single from Celine Dion's album C'est pour toi. It was released on 9 September 1985 in Quebec, Canada. On 21 September 1985 the song entered the Quebec Singles Chart and reached number 3, spending twenty weeks on the chart. It included as B-side another album track called "Pour vous". A music video was made for the C'est pour toi TV special in 1985. "C'est pour toi" was featured also on Dion's later compilations: Les chansons en or (1986) and The Best Of (1988).

Track listings and formats
Canadian 7" single
"C'est pour toi" – 3:56
"Pour vous" – 3:12

Charts

References

1985 singles
1985 songs
Celine Dion songs
French-language songs
Pop ballads
Song recordings produced by Eddy Marnay
Songs written by Eddy Marnay